Bus Riders Union may refer to:
 Bus Riders Union (Los Angeles)
 Bus Riders Union (Vancouver)